Skegness Grammar School (sometimes SGS) is a coeducational grammar school and sixth form with academy status, located in Skegness, Lincolnshire, England.

Selection to the school is by the eleven-plus examination by entry test or personal interview. The school roll consists of 472 pupils including 106 pupils in the sixth form.

Skegness Grammar School was founded over 500 years ago by a Lord High Chancellor of England. It was the first British secondary school to be awarded Grant Maintained status by the government in 1988. The school has been classed as a High Performing Specialist School.

History

Magdalen School
In 1483 William Waynflete, also called William of Wainfleet, later the Bishop of Winchester, Provost of Eton College and Lord High Chancellor of Great Britain founded Magdalen College School in his home town of Wainfleet to act as a satellite feeder school for Magdalen College at Oxford University that he had also founded.

In 1933 Magdalen College School closed and was incorporated into its newer and larger buildings at Skegness where it became Skegness Grammar School. The school opened on Wednesday 20 September 1933, and cost £30,000 for 200 places. The headteacher was Kenneth George Spendlove.

School houses
The school is organised into four houses all named after historically prominent people or famous Lincolnshire men:

Lumley - after Aldred Lumley, 10th Earl of Scarbrough a major local landowner who was responsible for developing Skegness as a major Victorian holiday resort.

Magdalen - after the Magdalen College School in Wainfleet founded by William of Waynflete, one-time Bishop of Winchester and founder of the college by the same name at Oxford University.

Newton - after Lincolnshire's most famous son Sir Isaac Newton, FRS (4 January 164331 March 1727) who was an English physicist, mathematician, astronomer, natural philosopher, alchemist and theologian.

Tennyson - after locally born Alfred Lord Tennyson (6 August 1809 – 6 October 1892) who was Poet Laureate of the United Kingdom and one of the most popular classical English poets of all time.

Grant maintained
The Education Reform Act of 1988 introduced the concept of Grant-maintained schools which shifted the school funding away from the local education authority to direct grant support by central government. Skegness Grammar was the first school in the UK to both apply for and be awarded grant maintained status.

The grant maintained system was dis-established by the new Labour government in 1998 and schools were offered the choice of returning to local education authority funding or opting for foundation status.

Academy
The school converted to academy status on 1 September 2012, and is now sponsored by the David Ross Education Trust.

Notable alumni

 Noël Greig, playwright and gay rights campaigner.
 Tom Jarvis, Commonwealth Games table tennis player
 Debbie Jenner (Doris D), dancer in the Netherlands
 Neil Wallis, former deputy editor of the News of the World, former editor of the Sunday People.
 Robin Hunter-Clarke, Chief of Staff to the UK Independence Party in the National Assembly for Wales and Chief of Staff to Neil Hamilton.

Former teachers
 John Littlewood (chess player) taught French and Maths from 1955-67; he ran the school chess team

References

External links
 The Skegness Grammar School Website
 BBC - Skegness Grammar School exam results
 BBC - Grammar schools dominate the league tables

Boarding schools in Lincolnshire
State funded boarding schools in England
Educational institutions established in the 15th century
Grammar schools in Lincolnshire
1483 establishments in England
Academies in Lincolnshire

Skegness